David D. Cole is the National Legal Director of the American Civil Liberties Union (ACLU). Before joining the ACLU in July 2016, Cole was the Hon. George J. Mitchell Professor in Law and Public Policy at the Georgetown University Law Center from March 2014 through December 2016. He has published in various legal fields including constitutional law, national security, criminal justice, civil rights, and law and literature. Cole has litigated several significant First Amendment cases in the Supreme Court of the United States, as well a number of influential cases concerning civil rights and national security. He is also a legal correspondent to several mainstream media outlets and publications.

Legal career 
Cole graduated magna cum laude from Yale College in 1980 and received his Juris Doctor (J.D.) degree from Yale Law School in 1984. After graduating from law school, Cole served as a law clerk to Judge Arlin Adams of the United States Court of Appeals for the Third Circuit. He then became a staff attorney for the Center for Constitutional Rights, where he litigated a number of major First Amendment cases, including Texas v. Johnson, 491 U.S. 397 (1989), United States v. Eichman, 496 U.S. 928 (1990), and United States v. Haggerty (consolidated with Eichman). He later served as a voluntary staff attorney at the Center, where he also sat on the Board of Directors from 1996 to 2003.

After leaving the Center for Constitutional Rights, David Cole began teaching at Georgetown University Law Center. While teaching at Georgetown Law, Cole continued to litigate constitutional law and civil liberties, both at home and abroad. During the 1990s, Cole argued over a dozen cases in various U.S. District and Circuit Courts, and appeared before the Supreme Court three times (Lebron v. National Railroad Passenger Corporation, 513 U.S. 374 (1995), National Endowment for the Arts v. Finley, 524 U.S. 569 (1998), and Reno v. American-Arab Anti-Discrimination Committee, 525 U.S. 471 (1999)). Internationally, Cole successfully challenged Ireland's constitutional prohibition on counseling about abortion before the European Court of Human Rights in Open Door Counselling, Ltd. v. Republic of Ireland, ECHR Judgment of October 19, 1992, Ser. A, No. 246. He returned to Europe in Fall 2007 to teach at the University College London School of Public Policy and serve as Co-Director of the Center for Transnational Legal Studies in London from 2008 to 2009.

Cole was named Co-Chair of the Constitution Project's Liberty and Security Committee in 2001 and joined the Advisory Committee for the Free Expression Policy Project in 2003. He has served on boards for a number of public interest organizations including Human Rights Watch Advisory Committee, Bill of Rights Defense Committee, and the American Bar Association Standing Committee on Law and National Security. His most recent appearance before the Supreme Court was in 2010, challenging the First and Fifth Amendment implications of the USA PATRIOT Act's prohibition on providing "material support" to terrorist groups in Holder v. Humanitarian Law Project, 561 U.S. 1 (2010). From 2013 to 2014, Cole was a Fellow with the Open Society Foundations, an international grantmaking network founded by business magnate George Soros that dispenses financial contributions to various liberal and progressive political causes in the United States.

Academic career
David Cole was a member of the Georgetown University Law Center faculty from 1990 to 2016. He has also taught at New York University Law School and University College London's School of Public Policy as a visiting scholar. As a professor, Cole's main areas of expertise were constitutional law, criminal procedure, national security, and law relating to United States federal courts. He gained tenure at Georgetown Law in 1994, and was selected as the school's inaugural Hon. George J. Mitchell Professor in Law and Public Policy.

Cole has written eight books for which he has received numerous awards, including the Palmer Civil Liberties Prize for best book on national security and civil liberties, the American Book Award (2004), and Boston Book Review's Best Non-Fiction Book (1999). His most recent book, Engines of Liberty: The Power of Citizen Activists to Make Constitutional Law, was named one of the Washington Post's Notable Nonfiction Books of 2016. In addition to writing, Cole has also lectured and contributed academic articles on related topics including judicial review, domestic drugs policy, the War on Terror, and capital punishment. He has been published in law journals nationwide, including the Yale Law Journal, Stanford Law Review, University of Chicago Law Review, and California Law Review. He has also written articles for numerous mainstream publications, including The New York Times, The Washington Post, The New Republic, The Wall Street Journal, and the Los Angeles Times.

Media commentary 
Cole has been the Legal Affairs Correspondent for The Nation since 1998.  He is also a commentator on the National Public Radio program All Things Considered, providing viewpoints from a liberal / progressive perspective, and a contributor to the New York Review of Books. He was interviewed in the 2004 BBC documentary The Power of Nightmares - The Rise Of The Politics Of Fear.

Honors and awards
David Cole has received awards from professional bodies and campaigning groups for his civil rights and civil liberties work, including from the American Bar Association's Individual Rights and Responsibilities Section, the National Lawyers Guild, the American-Arab Anti-Discrimination Committee, and the American Muslim Council. In 2004 he received the William J. Brennan Award from the Thomas Jefferson Center for the Protection of Free Expression, which cited Cole as "one of the nation's most accomplished advocates for freedom of expression and an outstanding scholar of the First Amendment".

In 2013 David Cole also was the first recipient of the ACLU's Norman Dorsen Presidential Prize for academic contributions to civil liberties.

Publications

Personal life
Cole is married to former Georgetown Law professor and current D.C. Circuit Court of Appeals judge Nina Pillard. They have two children, Sarah and Aidan Pillard.

References

External links 
 Georgetown Law Faculty: David D. Cole biography and selected publications
 Center for Constitutional Rights
 The Nation: articles by David D. Cole
 SSRN: articles by David D. Cole
 Video:  David Cole - Enemy Aliens & Constitutional Freedoms (February 27, 2007)
 Cole article archive from The New York Review of Books

1958 births
American Book Award winners
American lawyers
American legal scholars
American legal writers
Constitution Project
Georgetown University Law Center faculty
Living people
The Nation (U.S. magazine) people
Yale College alumni
Yale Law School alumni